The 1996 Oregon Ducks football team represented the University of Oregon during the 1996 NCAA Division I-A football season. They were led by head coach Mike Bellotti, who was in his 2nd season as head coach of the Ducks. They played their home games at Autzen Stadium in Eugene, Oregon and participated as members of the Pacific-10 Conference.

Schedule

References

Oregon
Oregon Ducks football seasons
Oregon Ducks football